Major General Gary Lynn Harrell (June 1, 1951 – February 14, 2023) was a United States Army general. He participated in numerous combat operations including Operation Just Cause in 1989, the Battle of Mogadishu in 1993, and the wars in Iraq and Afghanistan.

Military career
Harrell earned his commission as an Infantry officer through East Tennessee State University's Army ROTC program in 1973 and was assigned to the 2nd Battalion, 508th Infantry Regiment, 82nd Airborne Division, as a rifle platoon leader and as an anti-tank platoon leader. In 1977, after completing the Special Forces Qualification Course, he was assigned to the 7th Special Forces Group. In 1980 Harrell served as a company commander in the 1st Battalion, 505th Infantry Regiment, 82nd Airborne Division. Harrell participated in the invasion of Grenada and afterwards served with the 10th Special Forces Group. In 1985 Harrell volunteered for and completed a specialized selection and operator training course for assignment to the Army's 1st Special Forces Operational Detachment – Delta, publicly known as Delta Force, at Fort Bragg. He served at this unit as Troop Commander and participated in Operation Just Cause. Later on Harrell was assigned to the Joint Special Operations Command as operations officer and participated in Operations Desert Shield and Desert Storm.

In 1992, Harrell returned to Fort Bragg and took command of C squadron of Delta Force and participated in combat operations during Operation Gothic Serpent including the Battle of Mogadishu. In October 1993 he was severely wounded by enemy mortar fire. After graduating from the United States Army War College, Carlisle Barracks, Pennsylvania, in June 1995, Harrell was assigned as the Deputy Commander of Delta Force and commanded the unit from July 1998 to July 2000. Afterwards he was appointed the Director, Joint Security Directorate, United States Central Command from 2000 to 2002. During the War in Afghanistan, he commanded Special Forces Task Force Bowie and was the Assistant Division Commander for the 10th Mountain Division during Operation Anaconda. From 2003 to 2005 Harrell was assigned as commanding general, Special Operations Command Central. During Operation Iraqi Freedom, Harrell commanded special operations forces that were responsible for combat operations to prevent Scud missiles from being launched from Western Iraq and for stability operations in Northern Iraq. He last served as the Deputy Commanding General of the Army Special Operations Command. He retired in 2008.

Death
Harrell died from glioblastoma on February 14, 2023, at the age of 71.

Awards and decorations

References

Sources
Boykin, William G., and Lynn Vincent. Never Surrender: a Soldier's Journey to the Crossroads of Faith and Freedom. Faith Words, 2011. 
Tucker, Spencer. The Encyclopedia of Middle East Wars: the United States in the Persian Gulf, Afghanistan, and Iraq Conflicts. ABC-CLIO, 2010. 

1951 births
2023 deaths
Battle of Mogadishu (1993)
Delta Force
East Tennessee State University alumni
Members of the United States Army Special Forces
Military personnel from Tennessee
People from Jonesborough, Tennessee
United States Army personnel of the Iraq War
United States Army personnel of the War in Afghanistan (2001–2021)
United States Army generals
Deaths from glioblastoma